Saint-Étienne-Vallée-Française is a commune in the Lozère department in southern France.

The Scottish author Robert Louis Stevenson passed through the village on 2 October 1878, as recounted in his book Travels with a Donkey in the Cévennes:

The Robert Louis Stevenson Trail (GR 70), a popular long-distance path following Stevenson's approximate route, runs through the village.

See also
Communes of the Lozère department

References

Saintetiennevalleefrancaise